Attorney General Ward may refer to:

Hamilton Ward Jr. (1871–1932), Attorney General of New York
Hamilton Ward Sr. (1829–1898), Attorney General of New York
Richard Ward (governor) (1689–1763), Attorney General of the Colony of Rhode Island and Providence Plantations

See also
General Ward (disambiguation)